Mitrasacmopsis is a genus of flowering plants belonging to the family Rubiaceae.

Its native range is Rwanda to Southern Tropical Africa, and Madagascar.

Species
Species:
 Mitrasacmopsis quadrivalvis Jovet

References

Rubiaceae
Rubiaceae genera